Catholic Church and Rectory, formally The Immaculate Conception Church, is a historic Roman Catholic church at 716 Franklin Street in Clarksville, Tennessee.

The Gothic style building was constructed in 1880, and added to the National Register of Historic Places in 1982.

References

Roman Catholic churches in Tennessee
Churches on the National Register of Historic Places in Tennessee
Gothic Revival church buildings in Tennessee
Roman Catholic churches completed in 1880
19th-century Roman Catholic church buildings in the United States
Churches in Clarksville, Tennessee
National Register of Historic Places in Montgomery County, Tennessee